San Martiño (Saint Martin) is a small island off the north coast of Galician, Spain, at the mouth of the Sor river and the beginning of Ría (estuary) of O Barqueiro.

It is formed from a meander of the Sor river.

The island belongs to the parish of As Negradas, municipality of O Vicedo.

History

The island had a Celtic settlement (Castro) on the hill in the middle of the island. This settlement is called "Cova dos Mouros" by the local people.

During the Middle Ages there was a Benedictine convent that lasted until the 15th century, Maria Vizoso being its last prioress.

It was a fertile, well-cultivated soil. Nowadays it is the island with the most forest mass (eucalyptus) in all of Europe.

Islands of Galicia (Spain)